Drew Struzan (born March 18, 1947) is an American artist, illustrator and cover designer. He is known for his more than 150 movie posters, which include The Shawshank Redemption, Blade Runner, Mallrats, as well as films in the Indiana Jones, Back to the Future, and Star Wars film series. He has also painted album covers, collectibles, and book covers.

Early life 
Struzan was born on March 18, 1947, in Oregon City, Oregon. In 1965, at age 18, he enrolled at the Art Center College of Design, then in West Los Angeles.

Career

Early career 
A counselor asked Struzan about his interests and told him he had a choice between fine art or illustration. The counselor described the two careers, telling Struzan that as a fine artist he could paint whatever he wanted, but as an illustrator he could paint for money. Struzan chose to be an illustrator, saying, "I need to eat." In his first year, he married and became a father. Struzan worked his way through school by selling his artwork and accepting small commissions. He graduated in five years, earning a Bachelor of Arts degree with honors. He also completed two years of graduate studies, and eventually returned to the school in later years, after the campus relocated to Pasadena, California, to teach for a short time.

About his career, Struzan has said: "I was poor and hungry, and illustration was the shortest path to a slice of bread, as compared to a gallery showing. I had nothing as a child. I drew on toilet paper with pencilsthat was the only paper around. Probably why I love drawing so much today is because it was just all I had at the time."

After graduating from college, Struzan remained in Los Angeles, and a trip to an employment agency found him a job as a staff artist for Pacific Eye & Ear, a design studio. There he began designing album covers under the direction of Ernie Cefalu, relishing the creative aspects the 12x12" size the record packaging afforded him. Over the next 5 years, he would create album cover artwork for a long line of musical artists, including Tony Orlando and Dawn, The Beach Boys, Bee Gees, Roy Orbison, Black Sabbath, Glenn Miller, Iron Butterfly, Bach, Earth, Wind and Fire, and Liberace. He also illustrated the t-shirt that George Carlin wears on the front and back cover of his album Toledo Window Box.

Among these, Struzan illustrated the album cover artwork for Alice Cooper's Welcome to My Nightmare, which Rolling Stone would go on to vote one of the Top 100 Album Covers Of All Time. Despite the burgeoning demand for his talents, however, Struzan was still only earning $150 to $250 per album cover.

Airbrushed one-sheets 
Along with a friend with a background in the movie industry, Struzan started a small company, Pencil Pushers, in a collaboration that would last eight years. It was during this time that he honed his distinctive one-sheet style and first became proficient in the use of the airbrush, which would later define him as a master of the tool. His first film poster works started appearing in 1975, although in those early days Struzan mainly did artwork for B-movies, such as Empire of the Ants, Food of the Gods, and Squirm. While his talent steadily grew in demand, it was his work done for a major science-fiction movie that would establish Struzan and his work in the public eye forever.

 In 1977 fellow artist Charles White III, well known for his own airbrush prowess, had been hired by David Weitzner, Vice President of advertising at 20th Century Fox, to create a poster design for the 1978 re-release of Star Wars. White, uncomfortable with portraiture, asked Struzan for his help on the project. As such, Struzan painted the human characters in oil paints and White focused on the ships, Darth Vader, C-3PO, and all the mechanical details of the poster art.

The unique poster design, popularly called the "Circus" poster, depicts what appears to be a torn posted bill on a plywood construction site wall. "It was necessity that invented that," Struzan explains. "They found out there wasn't enough room for the typography and the billing block they had left in the design. What can we do to make more space on a poster that's already been printed? Let's pretend it's posted, then they can put the type below the actual poster. We painted Obi Wan down the side and stuff across the bottom to make it wider and deeper."

Throughout the 1970s and 1980s Struzan produced poster work for such films as Blade Runner, The Thing, The Cannonball Run, the Police Academy series, Back to the Future, Indiana Jones and the Temple of Doom, Indiana Jones and the Last Crusade, E.T. the Extra-Terrestrial, The Muppet Movie, Coming to America, First Blood, Risky Business, D.C. Cab, Stroker Ace, *batteries not included, An American Tail, and The Goonies. By the 1980s, Struzan was producing approximately ten poster designs a year.

During this period, Struzan continued his association with Lucas by designing the original Industrial Light & Magic logo, and creating the associated one-sheet artwork for both the continuing Star Wars saga and the Indiana Jones series of films. In the process, Struzan's work became, in the public mind, the defining visual images representing those series. As such, he was also sought after to create new artwork for re-releases and reissues on video and DVD, book covers, theme-park rides and video game titles for those properties.

1990s–2000s 

In the 1990s, with the advent of computers and digital manipulation of images utilized to create poster art, Struzan was affected by the decline of traditionally illustrated poster art. While continuing to create artwork for such 1990s and 2000s films as Hook, Hellboy and the American poster for Harry Potter and the Philosopher's Stone, he started exploring other outlets for his work, including comic books, limited-edition art, and the collectible market. As such, his work has been featured on such diverse items as Franklin Mint collectible plates, including a twelve-piece set commemorating the life of Princess Diana, the 1996 cover for Parker Brothers board game Clue, and over 30 U.S. postage stamps, including the 2004 John Wayne stamp and the 2007 James Stewart stamp.

Struzan once lamented on the decline of traditional art in an e-mail exchange:

From 1995 through 1997 Struzan's work was shown throughout Japan in a series of one-man exhibitions, which offered his one-sheet work of Lucas and Spielberg films in a successful limited-edition program.

In 1999, in an exhibit entitled Drew: Art of the Cinema, Struzan had over 65 pieces of his artwork presented at the Norman Rockwell Museum in Stockbridge, Massachusetts.

For the release of Star Wars: Episode I – The Phantom Menace, George Lucas dictated that, contractually, Struzan's poster was the only art the foreign distributors could use, and other than the text, it could not be modified in any way.

2000s 
In 2008, Struzan in collaboration with his art director son, Christian, created the official poster for the 80th Academy Awards.

After completing the extensive artwork required for the campaign of Indiana Jones and the Kingdom of the Crystal Skull, Struzan announced his retirement on September 3, 2008.

In 2009, Struzan (in collaboration with Jim Sanders of Reel Ideas) produced a DVD, Conceiving and Creating the Hellboy Movie Poster Art, as a step-by-step documentation of his creative process, techniques, and industrial experience. Shot in his studio, the DVD is intended to provide an over-the-shoulder look at the thinking and techniques that go into Struzan's posters.

A February 2009 exhibit entitled Drew Struzan: An Artist's Vision at Gallery Nucleus in Alhambra, California, presented select pieces of the artist's for the first public exhibit in 10 years.

In September 2009 Struzan produced an image for publication in Kurv magazine of Mattel's Barbie, in celebration of that doll's 50th anniversary year.

2010s 
The 2013 documentary, Drew: The Man Behind The Poster, directed by Erik Sharkey, examines Struzan's life and work, and features interviews with filmmakers and actors involved with films for which Struzan has done poster work, including Frank Darabont, Harrison Ford, George Lucas, Michael J. Fox, Steve Guttenberg, Guillermo del Toro, Steven Spielberg and Thomas Jane. The film was scored by award-winning composer Ryan Shore.

Struzan came out of retirement to design posters for the 2015 documentary Batkid Begins: The Wish Heard Around The World and Star Wars: The Force Awakens.

In December 2017, to celebrate Struzan's 70th birthday, Robert Townson, Varèse Sarabande and the Golden State Pops Orchestra produced the tribute The Magnificent Movie Poster World of Drew Struzan – live in concert which featured Struzan's artwork displayed to the live orchestral performance of associated film music. The performance included composers Thomas Newman, John Debney, Brian Tyler, Marco Beltrami, Robert Folk, and Michael Kosarin, as guest conductors.

In January 2019, for the release of How to Train Your Dragon: The Hidden World Struzan came out of retirement again to create three separate posters for the How To Train Your Dragon film trilogy. This series followed the exclusive Comic-Con poster Struzan did for the release of How to Train Your Dragon 2 in 2013.

Published in 2019, Struzan illustrated the book A Bloody Business  about prohibition and organized crime, written by his wife Dylan Struzan.

Creative process 
To create his finished work projects, Struzan starts by sketching out drawings on gessoed illustration board, then tinting the draftsmanship with airbrushed acrylic paint, finishing up the highlights and other details with colored pencils and more airbrush if needed. The gessoed foundation allows Struzan the luxury of being able to accommodate any requested changes to the work. Preferring to work on a 1 to 1 scale, Struzan's one-sheet work would be approximately 27 x 40 inches, the size of a printed movie poster. Working from reference photographs and live models, Struzan has been known, at times, to include depictions of himself, family members and friends in his work. He is known for working very quickly; typically takes him a week to two weeks to finish a painting. With the theatrical release of the Star Wars special editions, Struzan created the three panel triptych within the limited four-week deadline. The poster artwork for John Carpenter's 1982 remake of The Thing was created overnight, having received that assignment less than a day before the finished poster was needed.

Personal life 
Working from a backyard studio, Struzan lives in California with his wife, Dylan. He has a son named Christian and since retiring from full-time work in 2008 spends much of his time caring for his grandchildren.

Published collections 
 Drew Struzan: Oeuvre  – a hardbound edition of Struzan's works, ranging from movie posters to album and book covers. Due to financial problems with the publisher, Dreamwave, Struzan lost a considerable amount of personally invested money on this volume.
 The Art of Drew Struzan – Star Wars Portfolio  
 The Movie Posters Of Drew Struzan

Awards 
 2002 Saturn Award
 2010 Inkpot Award
 2014 Saul Bass Award
 2015 Art Center College of Design Alumni Lifetime Achievement Award
 2016 Sergio Award for Lifetime Achievement from the Comic Art Professional Society (CAPS) 
 2020 Society of Illustrators Hall of Fame

See also 
 :Category:Albums with cover art by Drew Struzan

References

External links 

 
 
 The Drew Movie Poster Page
 Original Album Cover Art
 
 Drew Struzan Facebook Page

Interviews 
 "The Last Movie-Poster Artist". Time.
 "Face To Face With The Masters: Drew Struzan". The Force.net.
Carter, Jeff (1997). "Drew Struzan". Echostation.com.

1947 births
Living people
Artists from California
American illustrators
Film poster artists
People from Oregon City, Oregon
Art Center College of Design alumni
American poster artists
Disney people
Inkpot Award winners